The Hellfire Club was a name for several exclusive clubs for high-society rakes established in Britain  and Ireland in the 18th century.

Hellfire Club may also refer to:

Hellfire Club (comics), a fictional society in the Marvel Comics universe
Hellfire Club (album), an album by Edguy
The Hellfire Club (film), a 1960 film starring Peter Cushing
Hellfire Club, Dublin, a ruined building on Montpelier Hill in the Dublin Mountains, Ireland
The Hellfire Club (Straub novel), a novel by Peter Straub
The Hellfire Club (novel), a 2018 novel by Jake Tapper
The Hellfire Club, a closed BDSM nightclub in New York City's Meatpacking District
"Chapter One: The Hellfire Club", a season 4 episode of the television series Stranger Things